Chloride channel accessory 2 is a protein that in humans is encoded by the CLCA2 gene.

The protein encoded by this gene belongs to the calcium sensitive chloride conductance protein family. To date, all members of this gene family map to the same site on chromosome 1p31-p22 and share high degrees of homology in size, sequence and predicted structure, but differ significantly in their tissue distributions. Since this protein is expressed predominantly in trachea and lung, it is suggested to play a role in the complex pathogenesis of cystic fibrosis. It may also serve as adhesion molecule for lung metastatic cancer cells, mediating vascular arrest and colonization, and furthermore, it has been implicated to act as a tumor suppressor gene for breast cancer. Protein structure prediction methods suggest the N-terminal region of CLCA2 protein is a zinc metalloprotease.

See also
 Chloride channel

References

Further reading

External links
 
 

Chloride channels